Carex alliiformis is a tussock-forming perennial sedge in the family Cyperaceae. It is native to eastern parts of Asia.

The sedge has a short rhizome with long running stolons that are covered in bladeless, red to brown coloured sheaths. The loosely tufted culms are quite thick with a triangular cross-section and are usually  in height.

The sedge is found in eastern parts of China including the provinces of Hubei, Hunan, Sichuan and Guizhou. It is also found in Taiwan, Vietnam and Japan usually along forest margins, in forests or in open areas on the sides of mountains.

See also
List of Carex species

References

alliiformis
Plants described in 1903
Taxa named by Charles Baron Clarke
Flora of China
Flora of Japan
Flora of Vietnam
Flora of Taiwan